Lana Zakocela (born 1985) is a Latvian former fashion model based in Los Angeles.

Career
Zakocela was born in Daugavpils, Latvia. At the age of 16, she moved to England. She studied in Chatham Grammar School.

Zakocela used to be a model and previously appeared in some advertising for Garnier, Dior, Clarins, Lancaster, and Thierry Mugler, Lancôme, Cartier, and Graff. She appeared in a supplemental piece about parties in Vogue Taiwan in 2013.

Zakocela was featured in 2015 for a Spanish advert for Antonio Banderas' fragrance "Queen of Seduction". She was Maxims May 2017 cover girl.

Notable covers

 Bulgaria Elle (2017)
 Grazia Spain (2013)
 BIBA (2012)
 En Vie (2011)
 Monsoon (2011)
 Votre Beauté France (2009)
 Maxim (2017)

Personal life
In 2015, Zakocela, married entrepreneur and diplomat Justin Etzin in a lavish wedding in Seychelles. Etzin filed for an uncontested divorce due to Zakocela Infidelity in February 2017, but Zakocela contested, wanting a large financial settlement. The couple are still married and negotiating a divorce settlement.

References

External links
 
 

Latvian female models
Living people
Latvian expatriates in England
Latvian expatriates in France
1985 births